The Latvian National Museum of Art is the richest collection of national art in Latvia.  It houses more than 52,000 works of art reflecting the development of professional art in the Baltic area and in Latvia from the middle of the 18th century until the present time.

The museum is located in building in Riga, which is historically significant.  The building at 1, Janis Rozentāls sq. was designed by the German architect Wilhelm Neumann and built in 1905 — it is one of the most impressive historical buildings on the boulevard and is situated next to the Academy of Art.  It was the first building in the Baltics to be built for the purposes of a museum. Between 2010 and 2015 museum underwent a reconstruction, during which the total size of the building was doubled.

Gallery

References

External links 

Latvian National Museum of Art within Google Arts & Culture

Art museums established in 1905
Art museums and galleries in Latvia
Museums in Riga
National galleries
National museums in Latvia
1905 establishments in the Russian Empire